Lluís Planagumà Ramos (born 25 October 1980) is a Spanish football manager, currently in charge of Japanese club Vissel Kobe.

Career
Born in Barcelona, Catalonia, Planagumà started his managerial career with RCD Espanyol's youth categories. After eleven seasons in the role, he left the club and joined CE Pubilla Casas.

In December 2011, Planagumà was appointed UDA Gramenet manager in Tercera División, after previously starting the campaign in charge of the B-side. After only two matches in charge he left the club, and moved to fellow league team Villarreal CF C.

In July 2012, Planagumà was confirmed as manager of the reserves in Segunda División B. On 3 June 2014 he returned to his former club Espanyol, being appointed at the helm of the B-team also in the third division.

On 29 June 2016, after rejecting a renewal offer from Espanyol, Planagumà moved to another reserve team, taking over Granada CF's reserves. On 28 September, after Paco Jémez's dismissal, he was named as interim first team manager in La Liga.

Planagumà appeared in his first match as a professional on 1 October 2016, a 0–1 home defeat against newly promoted CD Leganés. He was subsequently replaced by Lucas Alcaraz, and returned to his previous duties.

On 23 June 2017, Planagumà was named manager of UCAM Murcia CF, newly relegated from Segunda División. He was dismissed on 13 November, after 15 games.

Planagumà was appointed at the helm of Hércules CF on 11 June 2018. In his first season in charge, he took the team to the playoff final where they lost 4–1 on aggregate to SD Ponferradina; he was dismissed on 16 September 2019 after taking one point from the first four games of the new campaign.

On 9 January 2020 Planagumà moved abroad for the first time, signing a one-year deal at J3 League club FC Imabari in Japan, under the presidency of former national team manager Takeshi Okada.

Managerial statistics

References

External links

1980 births
Living people
Sportspeople from Barcelona
Spanish football managers
La Liga managers
Villarreal CF B managers
RCD Espanyol B managers
Granada CF managers
UCAM Murcia CF managers
Hércules CF managers
FC Imabari managers
Vissel Kobe managers
Spanish expatriate football managers
Expatriate football managers in Japan
Spanish expatriate sportspeople in Japan
J1 League managers
J3 League managers
RCD Espanyol non-playing staff
Club Recreativo Granada managers